The Chapel of Sainte Ursule de la Sorbonne, also known as the Sorbonne Chapel, is a Roman Catholic chapel located on the Sorbonne historical site, in the Latin quarter of Paris. It was rebuilt in the 17th century by order of Cardinal Richelieu.

Background 

The chapel was built as part of Cardinal Richelieu's reconstruction project in the 17th century, and is the only structure from the project that survives.

The project started in 1627, with work on the chapel beginning in 1635 and completed in 1642, the year of Richelieu's death.

The previous chapel was demolished (shown today as an outline on the floor of the cour d'honneur of the Sorbonne), and the new chapel was established on the site of the former collège de Calvy.

The architect was Jacques Lemercier and the dome was painted by Philippe de Champaigne, while François Girardon sculpted Richelieu's tomb which originally stood in the church.

The chapel's northern side faces the cour d'honneur inside the Sorbonne building, and its western side faces the Sorbonne square and Victor Cousin street.

In 1887 it was registered as a national historical monument, joined in 1975 by other structures of the Sorbonne complex.

References

Roman Catholic chapels in France
Roman Catholic churches in the 5th arrondissement of Paris
University and college chapels